Zactinothrips is a genus of thrips in the family Phlaeothripidae.

Species
 Zactinothrips elegans
 Zactinothrips modestus

References

Phlaeothripidae
Thrips
Thrips genera